The Minnesota Duluth Bulldogs women's ice hockey began their tenth NCAA season as the defending NCAA Champions for a fourth time in program history.

Preseason
September 22: Pernilla Winberg was named the Western Collegiate Hockey Association’s (WCHA) Preseason Rookie of the Year.

Regular season
November 22: Elin Holmlöv scored four consecutive goals against North Dakota. This was the first time that a Bulldogs player scored four consecutive goals.
January 23: Jocelyne Larocque assisted on the four goals scored in the second period against the Minnesota Golden Gophers in their 4-2 win.

Player stats

Skaters
Note: GP= Games played; G= Goals; A= Assists; PTS = Points; PIM = Penalties in minutes; GW = Game winning goals; PPL = Power-play goals; SHG = Short-handed goals

Goaltenders

Postseason

Awards and honors
Elin Holmlöv, WCHA’s Offensive Player of the Week (Week of November 26, 2008)
Jocelyne Larocque,  WCHA’s Offensive Player of the Week (Week of January 28, 2009), this is the first time that a UMD defender is given offensive player of the week honors
Jocelyne Larocque, 2008-09 RBK Division I First Team All-American.  No other Bulldog defenseman in program history has earned a first team selection.

WCHA 10th Anniversary team selections
Caroline Ouellette
Jenny Potter
 Maria Rooth

References

External links
Official site

Minnesota-Duluth
NCAA women's ice hockey Frozen Four seasons
Minnesota Duluth Bulldogs women's ice hockey seasons